Plön – Neumünster is an electoral constituency (German: Wahlkreis) represented in the Bundestag. It elects one member via first-past-the-post voting. Under the current constituency numbering system, it is designated as constituency 6. It is located in central eastern Schleswig-Holstein, comprising the Plön district, the urban district of Neumünster and part of the Segeberg district.

Plön – Neumünster was created for the 1976 federal election. Since 2021, it has been represented by Kristian Klinck of the Social Democratic Party (SPD).

Geography
Plön – Neumünster is located in central eastern Schleswig-Holstein. As of the 2021 federal election, it comprises the entirety of the district of Plön and the urban district of Neumünster, as well as the Amt of Boostedt-Rickling from the Segeberg district.

History
Plön – Neumünster was created in 1976 and contained parts of the abolished constituencies of Rendsburg – Neumünster and Plön. Originally, it comprised only the district of Plön and the urban district of Neumünster. In the 2002 election, the Amt of Boostedt-Rickling was transferred to Plön – Neumünster from the Segeberg – Stormarn-Nord constituency.

Members
The constituency has frequently changed hands since its creation in 1976. It was first held by the Social Democratic Party (SPD) from 1976 until 1983, during which time it was represented by Horst Jungmann. It was then won by the Christian Democratic Union (CDU), and represented by Karl Eigen for a single term. Former SPD member Jungmann regained it for a single term in 1987. The CDU's Helmut Lamp won in 1990, but it again returned to the SPD in 1998. From then until 2009, it was represented by Michael Bürsch. Philipp Murmann of the CDU won the constituency in 2009, and was re-elected in 2013. He was succeeded by party fellow Melanie Bernstein in 2017, who was defeated by the SPD's Kristian Klinck in 2021.

Election results

2021 election

2017 election

2013 election

2009 election

References

Federal electoral districts in Schleswig-Holstein
1976 establishments in West Germany
Constituencies established in 1976